The 1950 All-Pro Team consisted of American football players chosen by various selectors for the All-Pro team of the National Football League (NFL) for the 1950 NFL season. Teams were selected by, among others, the Associated Press (AP), the United Press (UP), and the New York Daily News.

Selections

References

All-Pro Teams
1950 National Football League season